The Whitman County Gazette is a local newspaper in Colfax, Washington, United States. It was established in 1877 as the Palouse Gazette and merged with other newspapers in the city in the early 20th century, adopting its current name in 1989.

History

The first issue of the Palouse Gazette was published on September 29, 1877, by local residents Charles B. Hopkins and Lucien E. Kellogg of Colfax, then a small town in Washington Territory. The newspaper was established during the Nez Perce War, which brought settlers in the Palouse in conflict with the indigenous tribes of the region. The Gazette was sold to Ivan Chase in 1888 and renamed to the Colfax Gazette five years later. The newspaper expended to a four-page, nine-column layout in 1887, making it the largest in the Washington Territory at the time.

The Colfax Gazette, a Republican-leaning newspaper, merged with the Democratic-leaning Colfax Commoner in 1932, forming the Colfax Gazette-Commoner. The Commoner had originally been founded in 1885 and began regular publication in 1911. The combined newspaper's name was reverted to the Colfax Gazette in 1958 and renamed to the Whitman County Gazette in 1989 to reflect its county-wide coverage. The newspaper claims that it is the oldest continuously published newspaper in Washington state.

The Whitman County Gazette was formerly owned by A. L. Alford Jr., who also controlled the Moscow-Pullman Daily News and Lewiston Morning Tribune. Alford sold the Gazette to long-time editor and publisher Gordon Forgey in 2003. On March 1, 2020, Free Press Publishing acquired the Gazette from Forgey following their purchases of the  Colfax Daily Bulletin and Odessa Record. The Gazette moved to a new office in Colfax in July 2020.

References

Whitman County, Washington
Newspapers published in Washington (state)
Publications established in 1877
1877 establishments in Washington Territory